"Sweet Life" is a song written, composed, and recorded by American singer-songwriter Paul Davis. It was the third single he released from his 1977 album Singer of Songs: Teller of Tales, and his fourth-highest peaking pop hit, peaking at #17 on the Billboard chart in late 1978. On the Cash Box chart, the song spent three weeks at #15.  The song also reached #15 in Canada.

"Sweet Life" spent five months on the U.S. charts, longer than any of Davis' other singles except "I Go Crazy."

Chart performance

Weekly charts

Year-end charts

Other versions
A new version by Davis as a duet with Marie Osmond made the Country charts in 1988, reaching #47 (U.S.) and #55 (Canada).
A cover version was recorded by Frederick Knight and Fern Kinney the same year 1978 on Chimneyville Records based in Jackson, Mississippi, a subsidiary of Malaco Records.

References

External links
  
 

1978 singles
Paul Davis (singer) songs
Songs written by Paul Davis (singer)
Music published by MPL Music Publishing
1977 songs
Bang Records singles
1988 singles
Marie Osmond songs
Male–female vocal duets